Parkia parrii is a species of flowering plant in the family Fabaceae that is endemic to Fiji.

References

parrii
Endemic flora of Fiji
Critically endangered plants
Taxonomy articles created by Polbot
Plants described in 1883